WIVG (96.1 FM) is a radio station licensed to Tunica, Mississippi, serving the Memphis, Tennessee area with EMF's Air 1 worship music format. Owned by Flinn Broadcasting, the station's studios are located in Southeast Memphis, and the transmitter site is in Coldwater, Mississippi near Arkabutla Lake.

History

Adult alternative (2004-2010)
From 2004-2010, the station aired an adult album alternative format called "The Pig." It previously aired on the stronger 107.5 FM. In 2020, "The Pig" moved again, this time to 87.7 FM.

Top 40/CHR (2010-2013)
From 2010-2013, the station simulcasted WHBQ-FM and its Top 40/CHR format.

Alternative (2012-2019)
On April 11, 2013, WIVG split from its simulcast with WHBQ-FM and began stunting with a loop of "Blister in the Sun" by Violet Femmes, and changed format to alternative rock at 4 p.m., branded as "96X".

Sports (2019-2021)
In June 2019, WIVG changed their format from alternative rock to a simulcast of sports-formatted WHBQ 560 AM Memphis, TN.

Rock (2021-2023)
On July 8, 2021, WIVG changed their format from a simulcast of sports-formatted WHBQ 560 AM to mainstream rock, branded as "Drake Hall Memphis Radio" (format moved from WPGF-LP 87.7 FM, which was to go off the air on July 13, 2021).

Air 1 (2023-present)
On January 16, 2023 WIVG changed their format from mainstream rock (which moved to online-only) to EMF's Air1 worship music format.

Former logo

References

External links

1998 establishments in Tennessee
Radio stations established in 1998
IVG
Tunica County, Mississippi